Regenerative Medicine is a peer-reviewed medical journal covering stem cell research and regenerative medicine. It was established in 2006 and is published by Future Medicine. The editor-in-chief is Chris Mason (University College London). 

Regenerative Medicine has an online sister community site called RegMedNet. RegMedNet is a free-to-join website that publishes news on regenerative medicine and cell therapy research, policy and business, editorials from leaders in the field and free educational webinars.

Abstracting and indexing 
The journal is abstracted and indexed in Biological Abstracts, BIOSIS Previews, Biotechnology Citation Index, Chemical Abstracts, EMBASE/Excerpta Medica, EMCare, Index Medicus/MEDLINE/PubMed, Science Citation Index Expanded, and Scopus. According to the Journal Citation Reports, the journal has a 2016 impact factor of 2.868, ranking it 15th out of 21 journals in the category "Cell & Tissue Engineering" and 23rd out of 77 journals in the category "Engineering, Biomedical".

References

External links 
 

English-language journals
Regenerative medicine journals
Publications established in 2006
Future Science Group academic journals